Coleophora haloxyli is a moth of the family Coleophoridae. It is found in Turkestan and Uzbekistan.

The larvae feed on Haloxylon persicum. They create a leafy case, consisting of six sections of branches which gradually enlarge toward the anterior end. There is a small tube at the caudal end of the case through which frass is ejected. Larvae can be found from September to October.

References

haloxyli
Moths described in 1970
Moths of Asia